This is a list of films produced or distributed by Universal Pictures in 1990–1999, founded in 1912 as the Universal Film Manufacturing Company. It is the main motion picture production and distribution arm of Universal Studios, a subsidiary of the NBCUniversal division of Comcast.

See also
 List of Focus Features films
 List of Universal Pictures theatrical animated feature films
 Universal Pictures
 :Category:Lists of films by studio

References

External links

 Universal Pictures

Universal
Lists of Universal Pictures films